John-Paul Giovanni Philippe Rochford (born 5 January 2000) is a Trinidadian professional footballer currently playing as a midfielder.

Club career
Rochford signed a two-year deal with Guatemalan side Antigua GFC in February 2021.

Personal life
His brother, Jean-Luc, is also a footballer.

Career statistics

Club

Notes

International

Notes

International goals
Scores and results list Trinidad and Tobago's goal tally first, score column indicates score after each Trinidad and Tobago goal.

References

2000 births
Living people
People from Arima
Trinidad and Tobago footballers
Trinidad and Tobago youth international footballers
Trinidad and Tobago international footballers
Association football midfielders
TT Pro League players
Liga Nacional de Fútbol de Guatemala players
Portland Timbers players
North East Stars F.C. players
Antigua GFC players
Trinidad and Tobago expatriate footballers
Trinidad and Tobago expatriate sportspeople in the United States
Expatriate soccer players in the United States
Trinidad and Tobago expatriate sportspeople in Guatemala
Expatriate footballers in Guatemala